Mangelia diatula is a species of sea snail, a marine gastropod mollusk in the family Mangeliidae.

Description
The length of the shell attains 5.5 mm, its diameter 2.5 mm.

The white, elongate fusiform shell contains 6- 7 whorls of which 2 in the protoconch. These are intermediary convex with linear sutures, discreetly undulant. The shell shows many longitudinal striae and oblique ribs. It shows manyrounded  ribs, 12-146 in the penultimate whorl and 10-12 on the body whorl. The body whorl measures about 3/5 of the total length. The rather narrow aperture is elongate. The outer lip is flexuously arcuate and incrassate on the outside and the inside. The round sinus lies deep under the suture. The siphonal canal is very short and wide.

Distribution
This marine species occurs off Lifou, New Caledonia, and off the Philippines;

References

External links
  Tucker, J.K. 2004 Catalog of recent and fossil turrids (Mollusca: Gastropoda). Zootaxa 682:1-1295.
 MNHN: Mangilia diatula
 

diatula
Gastropods described in 1897